Milton is an unincorporated community in Redbank Township, Armstrong County, Pennsylvania, United States.

History
A post office called Phoenix was established on February 4, 1847 with William Guthrie, postmaster. It remained in operation until 1908. Milton appears on the 1876 Atlas of Armstrong County Pennsylvania/

References

Unincorporated communities in Armstrong County, Pennsylvania
Unincorporated communities in Pennsylvania